The Sower is a Canadian documentary film, directed by Julie Perron and released in 2013. The film centres on Patrice Fortier, an artist and seed technician who tries to preserve biodiversity by planting and maintaining rare plant cultivars.

Geoffroy Beauchemin, Alex Margineanu, Sami Mermer and Francois Vincelette received a Canadian Screen Award nomination for Best Cinematography in a Documentary at the 3rd Canadian Screen Awards in 2015.

References

External links
 

2013 films
2013 documentary films
Canadian documentary films
French-language Canadian films
2010s Canadian films